

Events

January events
 January 1 – Boston and Maine Railroad, Maine, New Hampshire and Massachusetts Railroad and Boston and Portland Railroad merge with the new company keeping the Boston & Maine name.
 January 2 — Commencement of operation of the Railway Clearing House in London, established to settle the division of payments for through traffic over different railways in Britain.
 January 24 — Frederick William IV of Prussia makes the first train journey by a reigning monarch.

February events
 February 21 — Edinburgh and Glasgow Railway opens in Scotland.

March events
 March 31 — The Middleton Junction and Oldham Branch Railway opens to Oldham Werneth railway station in northwest England.

April events
 April 11 — The French government enacts the Loi relative à l'établissement des grandes lignes de chemins de fer which establishes the plan for French railroads' placement in a star pattern centered on Paris.

May events
 May 1 — Opening of first section of Upper Silesian Railway, between Wrocław and Oława, the first line within the borders of modern-day Poland. By August it reaches Brzeg.
 May 8 — Versailles rail accident: A train traveling between Versailles and Paris derails due to a broken locomotive axle near Moudon and catches fire, killing at least 55 passengers in the locked carriages.

June events 
 June 13 — Queen Victoria makes the first train journey by a reigning British monarch, on the Great Western Railway of England (Slough to Paddington).

July events 
 July 1 – The Bristol and Exeter Railway extension to Taunton opens in England.

September events
 September — Robert Davidson's experimental battery-electric locomotive Galvani is demonstrated on the Edinburgh and Glasgow Railway.

December events
 December — William Maxwell succeeds James Bowen as president of the Erie Railroad.

Births

October births 
 October 12 — Robert Gillespie Reid, builder of many Canadian railway bridges as well as the Newfoundland Railway (d. 1908).

December births
 December 7 — George Whale, Chief Mechanical Engineer of the London and North Western Railway 1903–1909 (d. 1910).

Unknown date births
 George Frederick Baer, president of Reading Company (d. 1914).
 Melville E. Ingalls, president of the Cleveland, Cincinnati, Chicago and St. Louis Railroad (d. 1914).

Deaths

References